Mount Rosebrook is a mountain in New Hampshire's White Mountains. It is part of the Bretton Woods Ski Resort, rising to the southwest across U.S. Route 302 from the Mount Washington Hotel. It is on the crest of the Rosebrook Mountains, with  Mount Oscar to the northwest and  Mount Stickney to the southeast.

References

External links

Rosebrook
Rosebrook